Jelena Janković was the defending champion, but lost in the semifinals to Caroline Wozniacki.

Wozniacki went on to win the title, defeating Kristina Mladenovic in the final 6–1, 6–7(4–7), 6–2.

Seeds

Draw

Finals

Top half

Bottom half

Qualifying

Seeds

Qualifiers

Draw

First qualifier

Second qualifier

Third qualifier

Fourth qualifier

Fifth qualifier

Sixth qualifier

References
Main Draw
Qualifying Draw

External links

Hong Kong Tennis Open
Hong Kong Open (tennis)
2016 in Hong Kong sport